Ouani Airport  is an airport in Anjouan, Comoros.

Airlines and destinations

References

External links

Airports in the Comoros
Anjouan